The 2017–18 UEFA Europa League knockout phase began on 13 February and ended on 16 May 2018 with the final at the Parc Olympique Lyonnais in Décines-Charpieu, France, to decide the champions of the 2017–18 UEFA Europa League. A total of 32 teams competed in the knockout phase.

Times up to 24 March 2018 (round of 32 and round of 16) are CET (UTC+1), thereafter (quarter-finals and beyond) times are CEST (UTC+2).

Round and draw dates
The schedule of the knockout phase is as follows (all draws were held at the UEFA headquarters in Nyon, Switzerland).

Matches may also be played on Tuesdays or Wednesdays instead of the regular Thursdays due to scheduling conflicts.

Format
The knockout phase involves 32 teams: the 24 teams which qualify as winners and runners-up of each of the twelve groups in the group stage, and the eight third-placed teams from the Champions League group stage.

Each tie in the knockout phase, apart from the final, is played over two legs, with each team playing one leg at home. The team that scores more goals on aggregate over the two legs advance to the next round. If the aggregate score is level, the away goals rule is applied, i.e. the team that scored more goals away from home over the two legs advances. If away goals are also equal, then thirty minutes of extra time is played. The away goals rule is again applied after extra time, i.e. if there are goals scored during extra time and the aggregate score is still level, the visiting team advances by virtue of more away goals scored. If no goals are scored during extra time, the tie is decided by penalty shoot-out. In the final, which is played as a single match, if scores are level at the end of normal time, extra time is played, followed by penalty shoot-out if scores remain tied.

The mechanism of the draws for each round is as follows:
In the draw for the round of 32, the twelve group winners and the four third-placed teams from the Champions League group stage with the better group records are seeded, and the twelve group runners-up and the other four third-placed teams from the Champions League group stage are unseeded. The seeded teams are drawn against the unseeded teams, with the seeded teams hosting the second leg. Teams from the same group or the same association cannot be drawn against each other.
In the draws for the round of 16 onwards, there are no seedings, and teams from the same group or the same association can be drawn against each other.

On 17 July 2014, the UEFA emergency panel ruled that Ukrainian and Russian clubs would not be drawn against each other "until further notice" due to the political unrest between the countries.

Qualified teams

Europa League group stage winners and runners-up

Champions League group stage third-placed teams

Bracket

Round of 32

The draw for the round of 32 was held on 11 December 2017, 13:00 CET.

Summary

The first legs were played on 13 and 15 February, and the second legs were played on 21 and 22 February 2018.

|}

Matches

Borussia Dortmund won 4–3 on aggregate.

Lokomotiv Moscow won 4–2 on aggregate.

Atlético Madrid won 5–1 on aggregate.

Athletic Bilbao won 4–3 on aggregate.

1–1 on aggregate. Dynamo Kyiv won on away goals.

Zenit Saint Petersburg won 3–1 on aggregate.

3–3 on aggregate. RB Leipzig won on away goals.

CSKA Moscow won 1–0 on aggregate.

Lyon won 4–1 on aggregate.

Red Bull Salzburg won 4–3 on aggregate.

Viktoria Plzeň won 3–1 on aggregate.

Lazio won 5–2 on aggregate.

Milan won 4–0 on aggregate.

Sporting CP won 6–4 on aggregate.

Arsenal won 4–2 on aggregate.

Marseille won 3–1 on aggregate.

Round of 16

The draw for the round of 16 was held on 23 February 2018, 13:00 CET.

Summary

The first legs were played on 8 March, and the second legs were played on 15 March 2018.

|}

Matches

Lazio won 4–2 on aggregate.

RB Leipzig won 3–2 on aggregate.

Atlético Madrid won 8–1 on aggregate.

3–3 on aggregate. CSKA Moscow won on away goals.

Marseille won 5–2 on aggregate.

Sporting CP won 3–2 on aggregate.

Red Bull Salzburg won 2–1 on aggregate.

Arsenal won 5–1 on aggregate.

Quarter-finals

The draw for the quarter-finals was held on 16 March 2018, 13:00 CET.

For the first time since the 2004–05 UEFA Cup, all the eight teams at this stage represented different national associations.

Summary

The first legs were played on 5 April, and the second legs were played on 12 April 2018.

|}

Matches

Marseille won 5–3 on aggregate.

Arsenal won 6–3 on aggregate.

Atlético Madrid won 2–1 on aggregate.

Red Bull Salzburg won 6–5 on aggregate.

Semi-finals

The draw for the semi-finals was held on 13 April 2018, 12:00 CEST.

Summary

The first legs were played on 26 April, and the second legs were played on 3 May 2018.

|}

Matches

Marseille won 3–2 on aggregate.

Atlético Madrid won 2–1 on aggregate.

Final

The final was played at the Parc Olympique Lyonnais in Décines-Charpieu on 16 May 2018. The "home" team (for administrative purposes) was determined by an additional draw held after the semi-final draw.

Notes

References

External links
UEFA Europa League (official website)
UEFA Europa League history: 2017/18

3
February 2018 sports events in Europe
March 2018 sports events in Europe
April 2018 sports events in Europe
May 2018 sports events in Europe
UEFA Europa League knockout phases